Kvalsund Church is a parish church of the Church of Norway in Hammerfest Municipality in Troms og Finnmark county, Norway. It is located in the village of Kvalsund. It is the church for the Kvalsund parish which is part of the Hammerfest prosti (deanery) in the Diocese of Nord-Hålogaland. The white, wooden church was built in a long church style in 1936 using plans drawn up by the architect Christian Thams. The church seats about 190 people.

History

The first church in Kvalsund was built in 1763. The church stood here until 1892 when it was torn down and replaced with a new church on the same site. The new church was designed by the architect Christian Thams. The church was built on unstable ground, so in 1936, the church was taken down and rebuilt on the present site.

See also
List of churches in Nord-Hålogaland

References

Hammerfest
Churches in Finnmark
Wooden churches in Norway
20th-century Church of Norway church buildings
Churches completed in 1936
1730s establishments in Norway
Long churches in Norway